InterConnection.org (IC) is an American 501(c)(3), non-profit organization headquartered in Seattle, Washington. InterConnection was established in 1999 by Charles Brennick. The organization's original focus was on developing and donating websites to non-profits in developing countries. The program soon expanded to include computer donations and technology training. In 2004 the InterConnection Computer Reuse and Learning Center opened in Seattle as a hub to serve both local and international communities.

Mission
InterConnection's mission is to make information technology accessible to underserved communities around the world. IC is founded on the belief that technology has the power to create opportunity for everyone. It is for this reason IC works diligently in the proliferation of information technology and training.

Activities
In pursuance of its Mission InterConnection manages and promotes a number of program activities. The following are four of InterConnection's main program activities:

Equipment collection
As technology advances many businesses, organizations and individuals find themselves with outdated computer equipment but no way to dispose of it properly. InterConnection's Computer Reuse and Learning Center, in Seattle, Washington, provides a location to properly dispose of old equipment in an environmentally friendly way. InterConnection accepts all computer equipment, regardless of condition. IC manages programs for both computer recycling and computer reuse. In 2007 alone, InterConnection kept 6,000 PCs out of landfills.
All donations received by (IC) are guaranteed to be handled appropriately; unusable equipment is recycled, viable equipment is refurbished and reused. This allows individuals, businesses and organizations to address  e-waste issues in a simple environmentally friendly way. IC is a 501(c)(3); all donations are tax-deductible and secure. Donors are provided with the necessary tax-deduction documentation.

Refurbished computers
Computers refurbished by InterConnection's low-income volunteers are made available to under served communities around the world for a small sourcing fee. This program not only creates a training environment for local community members it also makes information technology accessible around the globe. InterConnection's refurbished systems create academic, professional and economic opportunity for people throughout the developing world. All of InterConnection's refurbished computers are upgraded and fully tested before shipment. IC also provides order customization at the partners request.

Internet services
InterConnection's original purpose was to design and host free websites for small organizations working in the developing world. Now, IC focuses primarily on its refurbished computer and training programs. However, InterConnection still provides organizations with free web-design, web-hosting and free email services. By helping organizations create a web presence, IC is able to improve organizations ability to communicate and connect with like minded groups and individuals around the world.

Partnerships

Computer recipients
InterConnection has supplied over 25,000 refurbished computers to organizations around the world. The following is information on just a few of InterConnection's computer recipients:

Partner organizations

References

External links
InterConnection.org – InterConnection's Homepage
KiroTV News – Spotlight on InterConnection
Seattle Weekly – Focus on InterConnection
UN Environment Programme – Faqs about E-waste

Non-profit organizations based in Seattle
Charities based in Washington (state)
Development charities based in the United States
Organizations established in 1999
Recycling organizations
Recycling in the United States
Computer recycling
1999 establishments in Washington (state)